Anastasiia Soloveva (born 23 April 1997) is a Russian Paralympic athlete. She won a bronze medal at the 2020 Summer Paralympics in the Women's 400 metres T47 event.

References

Living people
1997 births
Paralympic medalists in athletics (track and field)
Athletes (track and field) at the 2020 Summer Paralympics
Paralympic bronze medalists for the Russian Paralympic Committee athletes
Medalists at the 2020 Summer Paralympics
Medalists at the World Para Athletics European Championships
People from Sverdlovsk Oblast
Russian female sprinters
Sportspeople from Sverdlovsk Oblast